Amos Sassi (born 29 January 1979) is an Israeli former professional footballer who played as a left-back. Sassi is often referred to as one of Israel's greatest wastes of talent and was the subject of a documentary in Israel on why Israel has yet to produce quality footballers and the hardships they face in improving in the Israeli system of football.

Playing career
Sassi was a product of the Maccabi Netanya youth system where he managed to catch the eye of a scout from German club Borussia Dortmund. He left Netanya for Dortmund along with Shlomi Dahan where the two enjoyed great success even capturing a world title in a tournament for ORT high schools.

Both Dahan and Sassi excelled at Dortmund, even taking the German youth championship while there. But in order to be able to play for Israel's full national team, they had to complete their mandatory service in the Israel Defense Forces. Both were loaned out to Maccabi Haifa where they languished on the bench. After a short period in Haifa, Sassi moved to Maccabi Netanya and in 2005 he retired after an unsuccessful spell with Ironi Nir Ramat HaSharon. Both he and Dahan are referred to as some of the greatest wasted talents ever in Israeli football.

References

External links
 
 Profile and biography of Amos Sassi on Maccabi Haifa's official website 

1979 births
Living people
Israeli Jews
Israeli footballers
Association football fullbacks
Borussia Dortmund players
Borussia Dortmund II players
Maccabi Haifa F.C. players
Maccabi Netanya F.C. players
Hapoel Nir Ramat HaSharon F.C. players
Israeli Premier League players
Liga Leumit players
Israeli expatriate footballers
Expatriate footballers in Germany
Expatriate soccer players in the United States
Israeli expatriate sportspeople in Germany
Israeli expatriate sportspeople  in the United States
Israeli people of German-Jewish descent